The Arrival is a 1996 science fiction horror film written and directed by David Twohy and starring Charlie Sheen, and co-starring Lindsay Crouse, Ron Silver, Teri Polo, and Richard Schiff. Sheen stars as radio astronomer Zane Zaminsky who discovers evidence of intelligent alien life and quickly gets thrown into the middle of a conspiracy that turns his life upside down.

Plot
Zane Zaminsky, a radio astronomer employed by SETI, detects an extraterrestrial radio signal from Wolf 336, a star located 14 light-years away from Earth. Zane reports his discovery to his supervisor, Phil "Gordi" Gordian, at the NASA Jet Propulsion Laboratory (JPL). However, Gordi dismisses the findings. Subsequently, Zane is terminated due to alleged budget cuts and blacklisted, which prevents him from working at other telescopes. Zane takes up a job as a television satellite dish installer and secretly creates his own telescope array with the aid of his customers' dishes in the neighborhood. He operates it covertly from his attic with the assistance of his young next-door neighbor, Kiki.

After relocating the extraterrestrial radio signal, Zane realizes that it is being drowned out by a terrestrial signal originating from a Mexican radio station. He attempts to seek the help of his former coworker, Calvin, but finds that he has passed away, supposedly due to carbon monoxide poisoning. Zane travels to Mexico and discovers that the radio station has been destroyed by fire. While exploring the area, he stumbles upon a recently constructed power plant where he meets Ilana Green, a climatologist from NCAR, and helps her safeguard her atmospheric analysis equipment from the plant's aggressive security forces. While being held captive at the plant, Ilana explains that the Earth's temperature has rapidly increased by a few degrees, leading to the melting of polar ice and a shift in the ecosystem. She is investigating the power plant, which seems to be one of several recently built facilities across the developing world that may be responsible for the rise in temperature. The two are released, but Ilana's equipment is confiscated, and Zane notices that one of the guards bears a striking resemblance to Gordi. As Zane and Ilana try to regroup, Gordi dispatches agents disguised as gardeners to release a device in Zane's attic that vacuums up all of his equipment. Zane leaves Ilana to continue investigating the power plant, but scorpions are planted in her room, killing her.

Zane uncovers that the power plant is a facade for an extraterrestrial underground base. The aliens have the ability to blend in with human society by wearing an external skin, and the base emits massive amounts of greenhouse gases. Zane is captured but manages to escape and returns to the nearby town to seek help from the local inspector. However, the aliens bring Ilana's body to the police station, making Zane a suspect in her death, prompting him to flee back to the United States. Zane confronts Gordi at the JPL headquarters and coerces him into confessing that the aliens are trying to raise Earth's temperature to eliminate the human race and create a more livable environment for themselves. Zane secretly records the conversation, and once Gordi becomes aware of the recording, he dispatches agents to apprehend Zane.

After returning home, Zane discovers that his attic has been emptied of all equipment. He enlists the help of his girlfriend, Char, and Kiki to journey to a radio astronomy array with the intention of sending his recording to a news satellite. However, Gordi and his agents sabotage the telescope and satellite controls from the main building, causing a delay in Zane's plans. Zane entrusts the tape to Kiki and instructs him to transmit it when given the signal. Zane and Char sneak to the telescope's base and lock themselves in the control room, making the necessary adjustments. When Zane orders Kiki to activate the tape, Kiki reveals himself to be an alien agent and unlocks the door for Gordi to enter. Gordi seizes the tape, preventing it from being transmitted.

Gordi and his agents forcibly enter the satellite control room with a van, but Zane subdues them with liquid nitrogen. While attempting to retrieve the tape from Gordi's frozen jacket, one of the agents accidentally releases a sphere that begins to engulf the room. Gordi thaws and attempts to grab Zane, but Zane amputates Gordi's arm with a fire axe. Zane and Char flee through the radio telescope station's access shaft and exit onto the collapsed dish before the device causes most of the base to implode. From their vantage point, they spot Kiki below and instruct him to inform the aliens that Zane will soon broadcast the tape. In the film's epilogue, Zane's conversation with Gordi is broadcast worldwide.

Cast

 Charlie Sheen as Zane Zaminsky, a SETI researcher
 Lindsay Crouse a Ilana Green, a scientist researching the effect of greenhouse gases in the Arctic
 Teri Polo as Char, an investment banker and Zane's girlfriend
 Richard Schiff as Calvin, Zane's colleague at SETI
 Leon Rippy as DOD #1, the lead agent hired by Phil
 Tony T. Johnson as Kiki, a neighbor of Zane's
 Ron Silver as Phil "Gordi" Gordian, Zane and Calvin's supervisor at NASA's Jet Propulsion Laboratory
 Silver also appears as a Mexican guard whom Zane meets in the fictional city of San Marsol

Production
Prior to the film's release, the working title was Shockwave. Filming took place primarily in Mexico, with additional scenes filmed at the Owens Valley Radio Observatory. The alien creatures were all digitally created for the movie by Pacific Data Images. Charlie Sheen had previously collaborated with David Twohy on Terminal Velocity, and Twohy had written the main role intending for Sheen to star.

Release

Critical reception
The film received mixed reviews from critics; at review aggregation website, Rotten Tomatoes it has a rating of 66% based on reviews from 35 critics, with an average score of 6.2/10, and its consensus states that "The Arrival is stylish and inventive and offers a surprisingly smart spin on the alien invasion genre."

Box office
The film was a commercial failure. It only grossed US$14 million in the North American domestic market, against an estimated production budget of US$25 million. Part of this was due to high-visibility marketing campaign for the release of Independence Day just over a month later, which went on to become a box office phenomenon. However, The Arrival had a rather successful run internationally, partly because Charlie Sheen still maintained high popularity worldwide at the time.

Home media
A Blu-ray version of the film was released April 21, 2009. Unlike the laserdisc release, the Blu-ray version includes no special features. The laserdisc release included commentary, documentaries and alternative endings not included in the Blu-ray or DVD releases.

Sequel
A sequel, Arrival II, was released on November 6, 1998.

Video game
The Arrival was released on Windows in 1997.

See also
 List of films featuring extraterrestrials

References

External links
 
 

1996 films
1990s science fiction horror films
1990s science fiction thriller films
American science fiction horror films
American science fiction thriller films
Mexican science fiction horror films
Mexican science fiction thriller films
1990s English-language films
Artisan Entertainment films
Films directed by David Twohy
Films set in Mexico
Films about extraterrestrial life
Films shot in Mexico
Films shot in California
Orion Pictures films
PolyGram Filmed Entertainment films
Interscope Communications films
Climate change films
Films with screenplays by David Twohy
Alien invasions in films
1990s American films
1990s Mexican films